Dmitry Igorevich Tursunov (born 12 December 1982) is a retired Russian tennis player and current tennis coach. At age 12 he moved to the United States to train and further his prospects of becoming a professional player. His career-high singles ranking was world No. 20, achieved in October 2006.

Tursunov jokes about his lack of ability and success on clay courts. He was sponsored by Fila and Wilson. He helped the Russian Davis Cup team win the 2006 Davis Cup and reach the finals of the 2007 Davis Cup.

Tennis career
Tursunov began playing tennis in Moscow at the age of five when his father made him play a few hours a day. He came to the United States to train with Vitaly Gorin.

I practiced a few hours a day. My dad realized fairly early that I had a lot of potential. A lot of people criticize him for basically choosing that career for me. He understood that I didn’t have many options to make money and since he really liked tennis, he decided that I was to be a tennis player. It just happened that I was naturally good at it.

Early years
Tursunov played his first match in June 1998 against Chris Groer in a Futures event in Los Angeles and won, but lost in the following round. In 1999, the Russian played in the Futures events in Philippines and United States and was able to reach two semifinals and a quarterfinal. In 2000, he broke a leg in January, which forced him to miss four months of the season. When he came back, he continued playing in Futures events in the United States. He reached his first Futures final in Haines City, Florida, but lost to Australian Jaymon Crabb. He then won his first Futures title the following week, defeating another Australian Peter Luczak. He reached another final in Hattiesburg, Mississippi, losing to Scott Barron and won two more Futures events in Malibu, California over José de Armas and in Scottsdale, Arizona over Stefan Wauters.

In 2001, Tursunov won the Futures event in Boca Raton over Jeff Morrison, then the Dallas Challenger defeating Justin Bower. After these two lower-level tournament successes, Tursunov qualified for his first ATP event in 2001 Kroger St. Jude International and made the quarterfinals, earning his first top-100 win over then world No. 51, Greg Rusedski along the way, before losing to eventual champion Mark Philippoussis. He continued playing on the Challenger circuit, reaching three quarterfinals, but his form suffered after his impact in Memphis because of what doctors believed was a bulging disk in his back. He returned after two months away, and then suffered a stress fracture in his leg. Tursunov was forced to miss six months and did not come back to tennis until June 2002, That year, he won another title on the United States Futures circuit and reached a Challenger semifinal and two quarterfinals.

2003–2005
After making two finals on the ATP Challenger Tour in Aptos losing to Jeff Salzenstein and in the Bronx, New York to Ivo Karlović, Tursunov qualified for his first Grand Slam event at the US Open defeating former world number one and then world No. 14, Gustavo Kuerten, in five sets, earning his first top-20 win before losing in the third round to Xavier Malisse. Continuing on after the US Open, he won two consecutive Challenger titles: in Mandeville, Louisiana over Jan Hernych, and in San Antonio, Texas over Sébastien de Chaunac, and then the semifinals of his next two Challenger tournaments. At the end of 2003, he finished the year ranked in the top 100 for the first time in his career.

Tursunov started the season of 2004 losing in the first rounds of Chennai Open and Australian Open, but won Waikoloa Challenger over Alejandro Falla. He then reached the quarterfinals of the Cellular South Cup losing to Mardy Fish. He then played in his first Masters event but lost in the first rounds of Pacific Life Open and NASDAQ-100 Open. He then reached the quarterfinals of U.S. Clay Court Championships losing to eventual champion Tommy Haas. He then lost in the first round in his next three ATP Tour in the Torneo Godó, French Open, and Stella Artois Championships. However, he rebounded in the Wimbledon Championships upsetting 19th seed and compatriot Marat Safin in the first round and eventually fell to ninth seed Carlos Moyá in the third round. At the TD Waterhouse Cup, he was able to reach his first ATP Tour semifinals retiring against Lleyton Hewitt. After the US Open loss to Fabrice Santoro in the second round, Tursunov was forced out of tennis again for seven months with a broken vertebra suffered in a boating accident.

He came back at the 2005 Indian Wells Masters tournament losing to Agustín Calleri. In his next tournaments he reached the second rounds of French Open and Stella Artois Championships, and the first round of Nottingham Open. At Wimbledon, Tursunov achieved his best ever performance in a Grand Slam tournament by making the fourth round. In his second-round match against then world No. 9, Tim Henman, he had to play in a Wimbledon club shirt as two of his shirts were stolen from the locker room before the match. He eventually defeated the local hope in five sets, earning his first top-ten win of his career. He eventually lost in the fourth round to Sébastien Grosjean.

He then reached the second rounds of RCA Championships and Los Angeles Open, the first rounds of Western & Southern Financial Group Masters and Pilot Pen Tennis and reached also the second round of his next four tournaments including the US Open. At the Kremlin Cup, he was able to reach the semifinals losing to compatriot Igor Andreev. He then won the Challenger event in Kolding, Denmark defeating Steve Darcis. In his last tournament of the year he reached the third round of BNP Paribas Masters losing to Nikolay Davydenko.

2006–2007

2006 was a successful year for Tursunov as he achieved his highest ever ranking thus far, he began by reaching the quarterfinals of Qatar Open and Medibank International losing to eventual finalists Gaël Monfils and Igor Andreev respectively. He then reached the second round of Australian Open to Tommy Robredo. At the Regions Morgan Keegan Championships he lost in the quarterfinals to Tommy Haas. He then won a Challenger event in Sunrise, Florida defeating Alberto Martín. At the NASDAQ-100 Open he was able to reach the fourth round of a Master Series for the first time losing to world No. 1, Roger Federer.

He then went 1–6 in his next six events only earning a victory over Gastão Elias at the Estoril Open. At the French Open, Tursunov lost to David Nalbandian after having a 2–0 set lead in the third round. He then reached the quarterfinals of the Queen's Club Championships losing to local hero Tim Henman and the first round of Nottingham Open losing to another local hero Andy Murray. He defeated then world No. 4, Ivan Ljubičić, in the third round of Wimbledon coming back from two sets to love, before losing in the next round. After losing his serve in the fifth set to give Nieminen an 8–7 lead, he hit a ball at the chair umpire's chair. He was given a point penalty and later fined £4,000 ($7,500) for "unsportsmanlike conduct". He called the chair umpire, Fergus Murphy, an "idiot" in the news conference he had after the match.

He then reached his first ATP final at the LA Tennis Open losing to Tommy Haas and followed it up with a semifinal performance at the Legg Mason Tennis Classic losing to Andy Murray. He then fell in the third rounds of Rogers Cup and US Open, and the second rounds of Western & Southern Financial Group Masters and BRD Năstase Ţiriac Trophy. He then won his first career title at the Kingfisher Airlines Tennis Open defeating Tommy Robredo in the semifinals and Tomáš Berdych in the final. He then lost four consecutive matches in the third round of Japan Open Tennis Championships and the first rounds of Kremlin Cup, Madrid Masters and St. Petersburg Open. He then reached the third round of BNP Paribas Masters losing to eventual champion Nikolay Davydenko. At the end of the year, he won a Challenger event in Dnipropetrovsk, Ukraine defeating Benjamin Becker in the final.

On 6 January 2007, Tursunov won the Hopman Cup in Perth, Western Australia, while representing Russia alongside Nadia Petrova. In the final, Tursunov defeated Tommy Robredo in straight sets, after teammate Petrova's victory over Anabel Medina Garrigues. Following this match was a pro set mixed doubles between Russians Tursunov and Nadia Petrova and Spaniards Tommy Robredo and Anabel Medina Garrigues. This match was a clear show of the playful nature of Tursunov and the other players. The match was relaxed since the outcome of the mixed-doubles pro set match did not matter. At one stage, Anabel Medina Garrigues switched with Tursunov so that Tursunov and Robredo were on one side, while Medina Garrigues and Petrova were on the other. The umpire assigned points to Spain regardless.

At the Australian Open, he reached the third round, losing to Tomáš Berdych. He lost in the first round of his next four ATP Tour tournaments. He then fell in the second rounds of Estoril Open and Internazionali BNL d'Italia, and the first round of the Hamburg Masters. At the French Open he fell to Fernando Verdasco. During the grass-court season he reached the semifinals of Queen's Club Championships and Nottingham Open to big servers Andy Roddick and Ivo Karlović. At Wimbledon, Tursunov was beaten in four sets in the third round by Tommy Haas. Ironically, Haas was unable to go on and play his next game against Roger Federer due to an abdominal injury.

In Indianapolis, Tursunov won his second career title, defeating surprise finalist Frank Dancevic. He then lost three consecutive matches at the Masters event of the Rogers Cup and Cincinnati Masters, and the US Open. Tursunov then rebounded by winning his second title of the year at the Thailand Open, dominating Benjamin Becker. He then reached the third round of the Japan Open losing to Feliciano López. He then lost early in Kremlin Cup and Madrid Masters. At the St. Petersburg Open he fell in the quarterfinals to Andy Murray. At the BNP Paribas Masters, he lost to Mardy Fish. As the defending champion, Tursunov lost in the final of the Challenger in Dnipropetrovsk, Ukraine to Mischa Zverev.

2008–2009
Tursunov played his first tournament of 2008 at the Qatar Open falling to Nikolay Davydenko in the quarterfinals. Medibank International in Sydney, Australia. He defeated Stan Wawrinka, top seed and No. 8 in the world Richard Gasquet, Sébastien Grosjean, and Fabrice Santoro. In the final, Tursunov defeated Australian Chris Guccione. This was his fourth career title. At the Australian Open, Tursunov beat Xavier Malisse in the first round. However, he then lost his second-round match against Sam Querrey in four sets.

Tursunov lost in the first round of the ABN AMRO World Tennis Tournament to Rafael Nadal, but combined with Tomáš Berdych to win the doubles title, defeating Mikhail Youzhny and Philipp Kohlschreiber in the final. This was his second doubles career title. In the Dubai Tennis Championships, he fell to Richard Gasquet. At the Pacific Life Open, he fell to Juan Ignacio Chela. At the Sony Ericsson Open, he defeated Richard Gasquet in their third encounter of the year in the second round, but lost in the fourth round to Tomáš Berdych. In Monte-Carlo, he lost to Igor Andreev. At the Barcelona Open, he reached the quarterfinals losing to German Denis Gremelmayr. He lost two consecutive first-round appearances at the Rome Masters and the Hamburg Masters. At Roland Garros, Tursunov won his first two matches against Daniel Brands and Guillermo García-López, and then lost to Jérémy Chardy in straight sets. However, Tursunov paired up with Igor Kunitsyn in the men's doubles event. They reached the semifinals, losing to Daniel Nestor and Nenad Zimonjić. This performance lifted Tursunov to a career-high doubles ranking of No. 36.

In Nottingham, Tursunov walked off the court when losing by a set and a break in a first-round doubles match after disagreeing with a line call. The next morning, the ATP announced that he had been thrown out of the tournament because of his actions. This included the singles tournament, handing second round opponent Thomas Johansson a walkover into the quarterfinals. At Wimbledon, Tursunov beat Nicolas Mahut and Chris Eaton, but lost to Janko Tipsarević in the third round. At the Indianapolis Tennis Championships, Tursunov upset top seed James Blake to make it to the final. He was unable to defend his title, losing to Gilles Simon in the championship match. At the Rogers Cup, Tursunov lost in the third round to Blake. He lost to eventual champion Andy Murray, also in the third round, at the Western & Southern Financial Group Masters, after earning his third victory of the year over Richard Gasquet. Tursunov represented Russia for the first time at the Beijing Olympics. He lost in the first round to top seed Roger Federer. At the US Open, Tursunov reached the third round by beating Eduardo Schwank and Victor Hănescu. He was beaten by his compatriot Nikolay Davydenko.

Tursunov then celebrated his fifth ATP title win at the Open de Moselle in Metz, beating Paul-Henri Mathieu in the final. He then suffered three consecutive losses at the Kremlin Cup, Madrid Masters, and St. Petersburg Open. At the BNP Paribas Masters he retired in his second-round match against Novak Djokovic. He then won a Challenger event in Helsinki in his last tournament of the year.

The Russian began 2009 by losing his first three matches at the Qatar Open, Medibank International, and Australian Open. He then qualified for the Zagreb Indoors, but lost to Ernests Gulbis. He then fell in the second round of the ABN AMRO World Tennis Tournament, Open 13, and Dubai Tennis Championships, losing to Jo-Wilfried Tsonga, Feliciano López, and Igor Andreev, respectively. He then reached the third round of the BNP Paribas Open to Rafael Nadal and the Sony Ericsson Open to Andy Roddick.

He came back at the French Open, losing in the first round to Arnaud Clément. On grass, he reached the second round of the Gerry Weber Open, losing to Philipp Kohlschreiber, and won the Aegon International, defeating Canadian Frank Dancevic in the final, his first grass court title. He then retired in his first-round match in Wimbledon against Mischa Zverev due to an ankle injury. He reached the quarterfinals Indianapolis Tennis Championships, losing to Frank Dancevic. He then lost four consecutive matches at the LA Tennis Open, the Legg Mason Tennis Classic, the Rogers Cup, and the US Open.

2010–2011

Dmitry missed most of the first part of 2010 due to the left ankle injury, and he had ankle surgery in February. He played his first tournament of the year at the French Open, falling to Daniel Gimeno-Traver in the first round. He then played on the Challenger tour. He fell in the first round in Wimbledon to Rainer Schüttler. He then fell in the second round of the qualifying draw in the Campbell's Hall of Fame Tennis Championships and the Farmers Classic. He won his first ATP match of the year at the Legg Mason Tennis Classic, defeating Teymuraz Gabashvili before falling to Tomáš Berdych. He again lost in the first round of the US Open to Jürgen Melzer in five sets. He then played in Bangkok, losing in the first round and quarterfinals of the Challenger events, and in the qualifying competition Thailand Open. At the Japan Open, Tursunov produced two upsets defeated world No. 25, Ernests Gulbis, and world No. 30, Richard Gasquet, before falling in the quarterfinals to the world No. 1 and eventual champion, Rafael Nadal.

In Russia as a wild card, he fell in the first round of the Kremlin Cup and reached the semifinals of the St. Petersburg Open, losing to compatriot Mikhail Youzhny. He then retired in his first-round match at the Valencia Open 500 against Pablo Andújar due to a left calf injury.

Tursunov began 2011 by losing in the qualifying draw of the Brisbane International to Peter Luczak and the first round of the Australian Open to Victor Troicki. He then competed in the Singapore ATP Challenger as a wild card, which he won. In Rotterdam, Tursunov was able to qualify and beat Andrey Golubev in the first round, before losing to fourth seed Tomáš Berdych.

At the Open 13, he defeated Grigor Dimitrov in three tight sets. He then defeated Ivan Ljubičić and then-world No. 10 Jürgen Melzer, his first victory over a top-ten player in over two and a half years. He then lost to top seed Robin Söderling in the semifinals. In the Dubai Tennis Championships, he fell to Marcel Granollers. He then competed on the Challenger Tour, winning the GB Pro-Series Bath. He reached the finals of the Athens Open, a Challenger event, but withdrew due to a knee problem. He then fell in the qualifying draw of the BMW Open and the first round of the French Open. On grass, he played at the Challenger Aegon Trophy falling to Matthias Bachinger. At the Aegon Championships, he fell in the first round to Feliciano López in straight sets. At his final Wimbledon warm-up, the UNICEF Open, he had wins over Robert Kendrick, Nicolas Mahut, Santiago Giraldo, and third seed Xavier Malisse in the semifinals. He then faced fourth seed Ivan Dodig in the final and won his seventh ATP title.

2012–2017
In 2015,  he won two men's doubles titles with different partners.

Davis Cup
As Tursunov's form started to improve and he came into calculation for selection in the Russia Davis Cup team, the problems he was having obtaining United States citizenship became apparent. Tursunov attempted over several years' time to become a United States citizen, but the process stalled  and Tursunov travels with a Russian passport and an American visa. In his own words "It's frustrating, but what can you do?" In spite of this, Tursunov was selected for Russia in the Davis Cup semi final against Croatia and won his dead rubber match against Ivo Karlović. In 2006 in the first round tie against Netherlands, he won both his matches against Raemon Sluiter and Melle van Gemerden. He defeated Richard Gasquet in five sets in the fourth rubber of the quarterfinal; consequently sending the Russians into the semi-finals of the Davis Cup. For the second time in 2006, Tursunov sealed victory for Russia in the Davis Cup; this time in the semi-final where he defeated Andy Roddick of the United States in a match that lasted 4 hours and 48 minutes, ending 17–15 in the last set. By virtue of this victory, he earned Russia the spot in the Davis Cup final against Argentina, which took place in December. Despite, earning the winning match in the quarterfinals and semifinals, Tursunov only played doubles partnering with Marat Safin, which they won to give Russia a 2–1 lead. Marat Safin later sealed the 2006 Davis Cup win for Russia with his victory over José Acasuso. 

Tursunov was named in the four-man team that played the United States in the Davis Cup final in 2007, in Portland, Oregon, from 30 November to 2 December 2007. He lost the first rubber of the 2007 Davis Cup final against Roddick. Tursunov was on the verge of defeating James Blake, but Blake won in the fourth dead rubber, the USA having won the tie in the previous doubles match. In 2008, Tursunov lost both his matches in the first round tie against Serbia losing in doubles and in singles, however they still won the tie 3–2. In the semifinal tie against Argentina, he won his doubles match, playing with Igor Kunitsyn. In 2009, he sealed the victory for Russia in the first round tie against Romania defeating Victor Hănescu in five sets. In 2011, he won his singles match against Sweden, however Russia had already lost the tie by losing the first three matches.

Retirement and switching to coaching
Tursunov retired from playing on the professional tour on 28 August 2017 because of another injury. In 2011, he mentored a 17-year-old ATP-player, Aslan Karatsev, for some time. He subsequently became the coach of WTA Tour tennis players Elena Vesnina and Aryna Sabalenka, respectively. From 16 August 2021 to 6 June 2022 he was the coach of Anett Kontaveit. He was the coach of 2021 US Open Champion Emma Raducanu for a short period in 2022. Since October 2022, he is coaching Belinda Bencic.

Awards
International
Tursunov represented December 2009 in the Association of Tennis Professionals calendar.

National
The Russian Cup in the nominations:
Mixed Doubles Team of the Year: 2007.

ATP career finals

Singles: 9 (7 titles, 2 runner-ups)

Doubles: 12 (7 titles, 5 runner-ups)

ATP Challenger and ITF Futures finals

Singles: 26 (17–9)

Doubles: 10 (6–4)

Performance timelines

Singles

Doubles

Top 10 wins

Notes

References

External links

 
 
 
 
 Dimtry talking to Gabby Logan on BBC Radio Five Live

1982 births
Hopman Cup competitors
Living people
Olympic tennis players of Russia
Tennis players from Moscow
Russian expatriates in the United States
Russian male tennis players
Russian tennis coaches
Tennis players at the 2008 Summer Olympics
Tennis players at the 2012 Summer Olympics